North Haven may refer to:

 North Haven, South Australia, Australia
 North Haven, New South Wales, Australia
 North Haven, Calgary, Alberta, Canada
 North Haven, Connecticut, U.S.
 North Haven station
 North Haven, Maine, U.S.
 North Haven, New York, U.S.

See also 
 Haven (disambiguation)
 New Haven (disambiguation)
 South Haven (disambiguation)
 East Haven (disambiguation)
 West Haven (disambiguation)